Butovo is a rural locality (a selo) and the administrative center of Butovskoye Rural Settlement, Yakovlevsky District, Belgorod Oblast, Russia. The population was 947 as of 2010. There are 12 streets.

Geography 
Butovo is located 34 km west of Stroitel (the district's administrative centre) by road. Cherkasskoye is the nearest rural locality.

References 

Rural localities in Yakovlevsky District, Belgorod Oblast
Grayvoronsky Uyezd